Scratch or scratching may refer to:

Science and technology
 Scratch (programming language), an educational programming language developed by the MIT Media Lab
 Scratch space, space on the hard disk drive that is dedicated for only temporary storage
 Scratching, a technique used in recrystallization
 Scratch reflex, a response to activation of sensory neurons
 "Scratches", a synonym for mud fever, an infection occurring in horses

Arts, entertainment, and media

Fictional characters 
 Scratch (robot), in the TV show Adventures of Sonic the Hedgehog
 Scratch, a fictional character from the Gobots series
 Scratch, a fictional character (who is the titular ghost) in the animated television series The Ghost and Molly McGee

Films 
 Scratch (2001 film), a documentary about disc jockeys and hip-hop culture
 Scratch (2008 film), a Polish drama film
 Scratch (2010 film), a short film produced by Breakthru Films
 Scratch (2015 film), a Canadian drama film

Music

Concepts
 Scratch, a technique of playing dampened guitar strings
 Scratching, moving a vinyl record back and forth on a turntable
 A participatory public performance such as Scratch Messiah
 Scratch band, a band that plays fungi music

Groups and musicians
 Scratch (musician), American hip-hop artist
 Lee "Scratch" Perry (1936-2021), Jamaican reggae and dub artist
 Scratch Orchestra, an English experimental musical ensemble
 Scratch Track, an American band

Albums 
 Scratch (Kenny Barron album), 1985
 Scratch (Kaela Kimura album), 2007
 Scratch (soundtrack), the soundtrack to the 2001 documentary Scratch
 Scratch, 1974 live album by The Crusaders
 Peter Gabriel (1978 album), a self-titled album also referred to as Scratch

Songs 
 "Scratch", by Crash Crew from the album The Crash Crew
 "Scratch", by Morphine from the album Yes
 "Scratch", by The Surfaris from the album Hit City '64

Visual art
 Scratchboard, a visual arts medium
 Scratching, a technique or variation of graffiti (street art)

Other uses in arts, entertainment, and media
 Scratch (magazine), a hip-hop magazine
 Scratch Radio, a community radio station in Birmingham, England
 Scratches (video game), a horror adventure game released in 2006

Sports 
 Scratch (horse), a French Thoroughbred racehorse
 Scratch in horse racing, the removal of a horse from a race before it is run
 Scratch in pocket billiards games, the pocketing of the cue ball
 Scratch golfer, a golfer with a handicap of zero
 Scratch race, a track cycling race in which all riders start together
 Scratch track (disambiguation), several meanings

Other uses
 Scratch, a small amount of extra money
 Old Scratch or Mr Scratch, a figure in American mythology representing the devil
 Scratch building, creation, from raw materials, of architectural scale models
 Scratchcard (or scratch card, or scratcher), a small card with one or more areas containing concealed information which can be revealed by scratching off an opaque covering
 Scratchings, a snack made from pork rind
 Scratch reflex, a response to activation of sensory neurons
 Scratchpad (disambiguation)

See also
From scratch (disambiguation)
Scratchy (disambiguation)
 Sgraffito, an artistic technique close to graffiti